The RNA Characterization of Secondary Structure Motifs database (RNA CoSSMos)  is a repository of three-dimensional nucleic acid PDB structures containing secondary structure motifs ( loops, hairpin loops ...).

See also
 Nucleic acid secondary structure

References

External links
 https://www.rnacossmos.com/
Biological databases
RNA
Biophysics
Molecular structure